The Northrop F-15 Reporter (later RF-61) was an American unarmed photographic reconnaissance aircraft. Based on the Northrop P-61 Black Widow night fighter, it was the last piston-powered photo-reconnaissance aircraft designed and produced for the United States Air Force. Though produced in limited quantities, and with a relatively short service life, the F-15's aerial photographs of the Korean Peninsula would prove vital in 1950, when North Korea invaded the south.

Design and development
The F-15 Reporter was created when the guns were removed from the experimental XP-61E, the last fighter variant of the P-61 Black Widow. With less than six months flying time, the first XP-61E was taken back to the Northrop modification shop where it was converted into an unarmed photographic reconnaissance aircraft. All the guns were removed, and a new nose was fitted, capable of holding an assortment of aerial cameras. The aircraft, redesignated XF-15, flew for the first time on 3 July 1945, with Northrop test pilot L. A. "Slim" Parrett at the controls. A P-61C-1-NO (serial number 42-8335) was also modified to XF-15 standards as the XF-15A. Apart from the turbosupercharged R-2800-C engines, it was identical to the XF-15 and flew for the first time on 17 October 1945. For unknown reasons Northrop subcontracted the nose for the F-15A to the Hughes Tool Company of Culver City, California. The F-15A used the existing P-61C wings (without fighter brakes), engines and tail sections but with an entirely new, more streamlined fuselage housing a crew of two under a continuous bubble-canopy.

As a result of continuing development trouble with the Howard Hughes-designed XF-11, the staff of the Army Air Force Headquarters determined an immediate need for 320 F-15 Reporters. Even before the first flight of the XF-15 an initial contract for 175 aircraft was signed in June 1945. Following testing it was determined that the F-15 Reporter possessed similar performance and flight characteristics to the troublesome XF-11, despite the Reporter being powered by less powerful engines, and using mostly pre-existing parts. This spelled the end to further development of the XF-11.

The first production F-15A was accepted in September 1946. However, the contract was abruptly canceled in 1947, possibly because the performance of the aircraft was rapidly being overshadowed by jets, with the last of only 36 examples being accepted by the United States Army Air Forces in April of that year. The last F-15 to be produced (serial number 45-59335) was produced as an F-15A-5-NO, which differed from the Block-1 version mainly in having a new internal camera installation in the nose. It seems that this change had been contemplated for the last 20 F-15s as well, since some records indicate that these were all eventually re-designated as F-15A-5-NO.

Design
The F-15 had a revised center pod with pilot and camera operator seated in tandem under a single bubble canopy. The first XP-61E, from which the first XF-15 was converted, had the canopy hinged to the side, while all subsequent XF-15 and production F-15 employed a sliding canopy. The aircraft's six cameras were placed in an elongated nose, replacing the XP-61Es four guns. Production F-15A were powered by the same turbosupercharged R-2800-73 engines as the P-61C. The aircraft had a takeoff weight of 32,145 lb (14,580 kg) and a top speed of 440 mph (382 kn, 708 km/h) at 33,000 ft (10,058 m). In the end, only 36 of the 175 ordered F-15As were built, and all were constructed from aircraft originally contracted to be built as P-61C.

The pilot was seated in the front, with the reconnaissance operator in the back. The back-seat occupant controlled the cameras and navigated the aircraft. However, the rear seat of the F-15A was fitted with a set of rudimentary flying controls, which made it possible for the reconnaissance operator to relieve the pilot if needed. Both crew members were rated pilots and both were trained in the reconnaissance task, so they usually alternated position on each flight.

Operational history
Of the 36 F-15As produced, nine were allocated to the Air Material Command in the Continental U.S., and the remainder were issued to just one squadron, the 8th Photographic Reconnaissance Squadron (PRS) attached to the 35th Fighter Group in Japan. The first four were sent over by ship, arriving in March 1947 at the Japan Air Material Area (JAMA), Kisarazu, Japan. Their voyage had not been smooth, and three of the four were in such bad shape that they were used for spare parts.

The 8th PRS had been non-operational for about a year, and was being brought up to strength to serve in the American occupation of Japan, participating in the Post-Hostilities Mapping Program in which the beaches, villages, road networks, and cultural centers of Japan were to be extensively photographed, work that was to be performed by the F-15 in association with the F-13 variant of the B-29 Superfortress. Under the command of Major Benjamin H. Albertson, the 8th spent most of the summer of 1947 preparing for their missions to come, spending June and July at JAMA helping to assemble the newly arriving F-15's. Captain Jarvis and Lieutenant Heistand were the first two pilots selected to fly back with the first pair of Reporters in late June. The squadron spent most of July test flying their new machines. Four additional aircraft arrived in July, giving the squadron seventy-three hours experience in the F-15. The unit's first operational mission would also be flown in July, with Captain Moore at the controls. The squadron lost its first F-15 in August when a pilot made a very hard landing. The plane was a write-off, but the pilot walked away. In September, Lieutenant Colonel Ben K. Armstrong became the commanding officer of the 8th. A unit strength of 16 aircraft was finally reached in October, the same month in which three aircraft and their crews were sent to Itazuke Air Base on the Japanese island of Kyūshū. The detachment remained there until December 1947, flying four- to seven-hour aerial photography missions. In January 1948, a detachment of six F-15s were sent to Clark Field in the Philippines to assist the 5th Reconnaissance Group. Eventually other detachments of F-15s from the 8th PRS were dispatched to Itzake and Chitose Air Base for various lengths of time. The detachment to the 13th Air Force in the Philippines would remain until early September, with crews being rotated every thirty days.

Maintenance was a problem for F-15 operations from the beginning. In January 1948, the entire fleet was grounded for ten days because of weather and a lack of spare parts, mostly heat exchangers that were found to be cracking prematurely. Because of the lack of spare heat exchangers, replacements had to be obtained from F-15s in storage at JAMA. By February 1948 the parts problem had become so critical that the 8th PRS had an average in service rate of only two aircraft. Cannibalization of both damaged and flyable aircraft eventually brought this rate up, but the unit would never reach a strength of sixteen operational aircraft again, reaching a high of fifteen only once, in December 1948.

In April 1948, Major Russell E. Cheever took over as squadron commander. In August, the unit was redesignated the 8th Tactical Reconnaissance Squadron (Night Photo). In addition, under the new U.S. Air Force designation system the name F-15A (F designating Photo under AAF classifications) became the RF-61A (R for reconnaissance and F for fighter). This immediately caused confusion, both because the F-15A was unarmed and was never considered a fighter, and because the F-15A was now reclassified as the P-61A both by the USAF and in squadron records (the P-61A already existing as the earliest variant of the original "Black Widow"). The designation of RF-61C was applied later, but by this point the unit had unofficially returned to calling the aircraft the F-15A, and would continue to do so for most of their operational time with the machine.

The end of F-15 operations came on 25 March 1949, when the 8th TRS (NP) was transferred to Yokota Air Base minus their equipment and personnel. There it became the 82d Tactical Reconnaissance Squadron. On 1 April, the 82nd, which consisted now of the former 8th's personnel and their F-15s, was inactivated and all F-15s were assigned to the 35th Maintenance Squadron at Johnson Air Base for salvage or other disposition.

Of the nine F-15A allocated to Air Material Command, several were operated for a short time by the Pennsylvania Air National Guard from their base in Harrisburg, Pennsylvania, before they too were scrapped.

Mapping of Korea
During their operational lifetime F-15As, mostly operating from bases in Japan, were responsible for most of the aerial maps of North Korea used at the start of the Korean War. These photographs were to prove extremely valuable, as it was not until the arrival of Marine photo-reconnaissance F7F-3P in late 1950 that additional photographs of the peninsula could be made, and then only under constant threat from attacking North Korean MiGs.

Civilian use
Some surviving F-15As were offered to civilian governmental agencies, or declared surplus and offered for sale on the commercial market.

An F-15A (s/n 45-59300) was used by NACA at Moffett Field in California to test some early swept-wing designs by dropping recoverable aerodynamic test bodies from high altitude. This program was later joined by F-61C serial number 43-8330, borrowed from the Smithsonian Institution for the duration of the tests. These drops were carried out over Edwards Air Force Base in the Mojave Desert in California.

The last flying example of the entire P-61 line was a rare F-15A Reporter (RF-61C) (s/n 45-59300), the first production model Reporter to be built. The aircraft was completed on 15 May 1946, and served with the USAAF and later the U.S. Air Force until 6 February 1948, when it was reassigned to the Ames Aeronautical Laboratory at Moffett Field in California. There it was reconfigured to serve as a launch vehicle for air dropped scale models of experimental aircraft. It served in this capacity until 1953, when it was replaced by a mammoth wind tunnel used for the same testing. In April, 1955, the F-15 was declared surplus along with a "spare parts" F-61C (s/n 43-8357). The F-15 was sold, along with the parts P-61, to Steward-Davis Incorporated of Gardena, California, and given the civilian registration N5093V. Unable to sell the P-61C, Steward-Davis scrapped it in 1957. Steward-Davis made several modifications to the Reporter to make it suitable for aerial survey work, including switching to a canopy taken from a T-33, and to propellers taken from an older P-61. The plane was sold in September, 1956 to Compania Mexicana Aerofoto S. A. of Mexico City and assigned the Mexican registration XB-FUJ. In Mexico, the Reporter was used for aerial survey work, the very role for which it was originally designed. It was bought by Aero Enterprises Inc. of Willets, California and returned to the US in January 1964 carrying the civilian registration number N9768Z. The fuselage tank and turbosupercharger intercoolers were removed; and the plane was fitted with a 1,600 gal (6,056 L) chemical tank for fire-fighting. It was purchased by Cal-Nat of Fresno, California at the end of 1964, which operated it as a firefighting aircraft for the next 3 years. In March 1968, the F-15 was purchased by TBM, Inc., an aerial firefighting company located in Tulare, California (the company's name representing the TBM Avenger, their primary equipment), who performed additional modifications on the aircraft to improve its performance, including experimenting with several types of propellers before deciding on Curtiss Electric type 34 propellers taken from a late model Lockheed Constellation.

On 6 September 1968, Ralph Ponte, one of three civilian pilots to hold a rating for the F-15, was flying a series of routine Phos-Chek drops on a fire raging near Hollister, California. In an effort to reduce his return time Ponte opted to reload at a small airfield nearer the fire. The runway was shorter than the one in Fresno, and despite Ponte reducing his load, hot air from the nearby fire reduced the surrounding air pressure and rendered the aircraft overweight. Even at full power the Reporter had not rotated after clearing the 3,500 ft (1,067 m) marker, and Ponte quickly decided to abort his takeoff. He made every effort to control the hurtling craft, but the Reporter careened off the runway and through a vegetable patch, before striking an embankment which tore off the landing gear. The aircraft then slid sideways, broke up, and caught fire. Ponte scrambled through the shattered canopy unhurt, while a firefighting TBM Avenger dropped its load of Phos-Chek on the plane's two engines, possibly saving Ponte's life. The F-15 was deemed too badly damaged to rebuild, and was soon scrapped, bringing an end to the career of one of Northrop's most successful designs.

Variants

XF-15  The first prototype, converted from the first XP-61E.
XF-15A  The second prototype, converted from a P-61C (number 43-8335).
F-15A Reporter
 Photoreconnaissance variant with a new center pod with pilot and camera operator seated in tandem under a single bubble canopy, and six cameras taking place of radar in the nose. Powered by the same turbosupercharged R-2800-73 engines as the P-61C. The aircraft had a takeoff weight of 32,145 lb (14,580 kg) and a top speed of 440 mph (382 kn, 708 km/h). Only 36 of the 175 ordered F-15As were built before the end of the war. After formation of the United States Air Force in 1947, F-15A was redesignated RF-61C. F-15As were responsible for most of the aerial maps of North Korea used at the start of the Korean War.
RF-61C Reporter  USAF designation for the F-15C from 1948 onwards.

Operators

 United States Air Force
 Alaskan Air Command
 449th Fighter Squadron (All Weather).  Formed from equipment and personnel of 415th Night Fighter Squadron at Adak Air Field, Aleutian Islands, Alaska on 1 Sep 1947.  Later transitioned to F-82 Twin Mustang in mid-1948.
 8th Photographic Reconnaissance Squadron.  Flew F-15A (RF-61C) Reporter (1947–1949) from Johnson AB, Japan. Aircraft reassigned to 82d Tactical Reconnaissance Squadron until inactivated on 1 Apr 1949
 Continental Air Forces
 57th Reconnaissance Squadron and 58th Reconnaissance Squadron. Performed Weather Reconnaissance training at Rapid City AAF, South Dakota  (July 1945-Jan 1946).

Specifications (F-15A Reporter)

See also

References

Notes

Bibliography

 Balous, Miroslav. Northrop P-61 Black Widow & F-15 Reporter(bilingual Czech and English). Prague, Czech Republic: MBI Publications, 2nd edition 2003. .
 Bridgeman, Leonard. “The Northrop Black Widow.” Jane’s Fighting Aircraft of World War II. London: Studio, 1946. .
 Davis, Larry and Dave Menard. P-61 Black Widow in Action (Aircraft number 106). Carrollton, Texas: Squadron/Signal Publications, Inc., 1990. .
 Jackson, Robert. The Encyclopedia of Military Aircraft. Bath, UK: Parragon Publishing, 2006. .
 
 Johnsen, Frederick A. Darkly Dangerous: The Northrop P-61 Black Widow Night Fighter. Washington, DC: Bomber Books, 1981. .
 Kolln, Jeff. Northrop's Night Hunter: P-61 Black Widow. North Branch, MN: Specialty Press, 2008. .
 Kolln, Jeff. The 421st Night Fighter Squadron in World War II. Atglen, Pennsylvania: Schiffer Military Books, 2001. .
 Pape, Garry R., John M. and Donna Campbell. Northrop P-61 Black Widow - The Complete History and Combat Record. St. Paul, Minnesota: Motorbooks International, 1991. .
 Pape, Garry R. and Ronald C. Harrison. Queen of the Midnight Skies: The Story of America's Air Force Night Fighters. Atglen, Pennsylvania: Schiffer Publishing, 1992. .
 Shulenberger, Eric. Deny Them the Night Sky - A History of the 548th Night Fighter Squadron. Seattle, Washington: Shulenberger Publishing, 2005. .
 Thompson, Warren. P-61 Black Widow Units of World War 2. Botley, Oxford, UK: Osprey Publishing, 1998. .
 Thompson, Warren. Northrop P-61 Black Widow: WarbirdTech Volume 15. North Branch, MN: Specialty Press, 1998. .
 Thompson, Warren. "Northrop P-61 Black Widow". Wings of Fame. Volume 15, 1999, pp. 36–101. London: Aerospace. .
 Wilson, Stewart. Aircraft of WWII. Fyshwick, ACT, Australia: Aerospace Publications Pty. Ltd., 1998. .
 Zbiegniewski, Andre R. 421 NFS 1943–1947 (Bilingual Polish and English). Lublin, Poland: Kagero, 2004. .

External links

 Joe Baugher's F-15 page

F-015 Reporter
1940s United States military reconnaissance aircraft
High-wing aircraft
Twin-boom aircraft
World War II reconnaissance aircraft of the United States
Aircraft first flown in 1945
Twin piston-engined tractor aircraft